Neoprotoparmelia siamisidiata is a species of corticolous (bark-dwelling) and crustose lichen in the family Parmeliaceae. Found in Thailand, it was formally described as a new species in 2018 by Garima Singh and André Aptroot. The specific epithet refers to its type locality (biology) (Siam is a historical name for Thailand) and the presence of isidia.

The asci of this species contain 16 ascospores; this feature helps to distinguish this lichen from the lookalike N. brasilisidiata. secondary compounds that occur in N. siamisidiata, detectable using the technique thin-layer chromatography, include alectoronic acid (major), and minor to trace amounts of dehydroalectoronic acid and β-alectoronic acid.

References

siamisidiata
Lichen species
Lichens described in 2018
Lichens of Thailand
Taxa named by André Aptroot